Philipps is an English, Dutch, and German surname meaning "lover of horses". Derivative, patronym, of the more common ancient Greek name "Philippos and Philippides." Notable people with this surname are:

"Philipps" has also been a shortened version of Philippson, a German surname especially prevalent amongst German Jews and Dutch Jews.

 Busy Philipps (born 1979), American film actress
 Colwyn Philipps, 3rd Viscount St Davids (1939–2009), British peer
 Kinga Philipps (born 1976), American actress
 Rhodri Philipps (born 1966), eldest son of the current Viscount St Davids
 Richard Philipps (1661–1750), British Governor of Nova Scotia
 Sir John Philipps, 6th Baronet (circa 1701–1764), Welsh Jacobite politician
 Sir Owen Cosby Philipps (1863–1937), Knight of Justice of the Order of St John
 Wogan Philipps, 2nd Baron Milford (1902–1993), only member of the Communist Party of Great Britain ever to sit in the House of Lords

See also
 Philippe (disambiguation)
 Philipps Baronets
 Philips (surname)
 Phillips (disambiguation)
 Phillipps

English-language surnames
Dutch-language surnames
German-language surnames
Patronymic surnames
Surnames from given names